Dmitriyevo is a rural locality (a village) in Grigoryevskoye Rural Settlement, Gus-Khrustalny District, Vladimir Oblast, Russia. The population was 186 as of 2010.

Geography 
Dmitriyevo is located 29 km southeast of Gus-Khrustalny (the district's administrative centre) by road. Borisovo is the nearest rural locality.

References 

Rural localities in Gus-Khrustalny District
Melenkovsky Uyezd